Oxyaciura formosae is a species of tephritid or fruit flies in the genus Oxyaciura of the family Tephritidae.

Distribution
Japan, Taiwan.

References

Tephritinae
Insects described in 1915
Diptera of Asia